Aruna Priyantha (born 4 February 1973) is a Sri Lankan former cricketer. He played in 134 first-class and 74 List A matches between 1995/96 and 2011/12. He made his Twenty20 debut on 17 August 2004, for Sri Lanka Police Sports Club in the 2004 SLC Twenty20 Tournament.

References

External links
 

1973 births
Living people
Sri Lankan cricketers
Sri Lanka Police Sports Club cricketers
Place of birth missing (living people)